The Citizens' Movement for Democratic Action (Ruch Obywatelski Akcja Demokratyczna, ROAD) was a market-socialist and political party in Poland. The party was centrist-socialist on economic issues and conservative to moderate-conservative on social issues. In early 1990, an open conflict erupted between the conservative and centrist wings within the Citizens' Parliamentary Party (Obywatelski Klub Parlamentarny) formed by Sejm members from the ranks of the oppositional, trade-unionist Solidarity Citizens' Committee (Komitet Obywatelski Solidarność); Lech Wałęsa dubbed this conflict, which he actively fomented, the "war at the top" (wojna na górze).

On 12 May 1990, the conservative- socialist faction led by  Jarosław Kaczyński formed a new party of their own, the Centre Agreement (Porozumienie Centrum, PC), which was going to support Wałęsa in the upcoming presidential election.

In response to this, the centrist and Christian democratic faction, which favoured Christian democrat Tadeusz Mazowiecki as president, decided to establish the Citizens Movement 'Democratic Action'. Formed in July 1990, this was a regular, structured party rather than a loosely knit movement as its name suggests. ROAD's founders include Zbigniew Bujak, Władysław Frasyniuk, Jacek Kuroń, and Adam Michnik, that are considered as moderate socialdemocrats.

A smaller, more conservative faction around Aleksander Hall had split from Solidarity's parliamentary party a few weeks earlier, calling themselves Forum of the Democratic Right (Forum Prawicy Demokratycznej, FPD). In the presidential election in November–December 1990, both ROAD and FPD supported Mazowiecki, who suffered a surprisingly clear defeat, receiving only 18% in the first ballot.

In May 1991, following intense arguments within the party, ROAD merged with the FPD and other pro-Mazowiecki groups to form the Democratic Union (Unia Demokratyczna, UD) with Mazowiecki at the helm. However, many ROAD members refused to back this decision; most notably co-founder Zbigniew Bujak, who proposed to take a more social-democratic direction and formed the Democrat-Social Movement (Ruch Demokratyczno-Społeczny, RDS) instead.

1990 establishments in Poland
1991 disestablishments in Poland
Conservative parties in Poland
Catholic political parties
Defunct socialist parties in Poland
Political parties disestablished in 1991
Political parties established in 1990